Blenders Pride launched in 1995, is a brand of Indian whisky, owned by Pernod Ricard. It is a blend of Indian grain spirits and imported Scotch malt. 

Pernod Ricard has identified Blenders Pride as the company's one of the five core brands to build its spirits business in India. The brand's main national competitors are Royal Challenge, Signature and Antiquity from United Spirits Ltd, and Peter Scot from Khoday India Limited, In some states, Blenders Pride also competes with Haig Gold Label from Diageo and Rockford Reserve from Modi Illva.

History
Blenders Pride was launched in India in 1995 by Seagram. Seagram's global business was jointly acquired by Pernod Ricard and Diageo on 21 December 2001. Seagram's Indian operations were acquired by Pernod Ricard. Pernod Ricard had previously entered the Indian market by acquiring a 74% stake in United Agencies Ltd (UAL), with a bottling facility in Kolhapur, Maharashtra. UAL was merged with Seagram's Indian business and continued operations under the name Seagram Manufacturing Ltd. The decision to integrate UAL into Seagram was taken due to the latter's larger operations in the country.

Reserve Collection
Pernod Ricard launched Blenders Pride Reserve Collection in December 2011. At the time of its launch, the Reserve Collection was the most expensive whisky produced in India. This whisky is a blend of Scotch malts that have been matured through the unique Solera process, with the finest Indian grain spirits, strengthening the Blenders Pride brand’s presence in the market even further.

UK-based consultants CARTILS helped design the branding, bottle shape and packaging for Reserve Collection. CARTILS said that its aim was to "stay loyal to the original brand yet to ensure that its [Reserve Collection] significantly more premium nature was clearly communicated." The bottle shape for Reserve Collection is similar to Blenders Pride but has embossing.

Sales
Blenders Pride sold 250,000 cases in 2003. out of 1.5 million cases country-wide in the premium whisky segment. In March 2004, Seagram Manufacturing Ltd. claimed that Blenders Pride had surpassed Shaw Wallace's "Royal Challenge" (now owned by United Breweries Group) to become the largest-selling premium whisky in Andhra Pradesh.

The following table shows the annual sales of Blenders Pride:

References

Blenders Pride Whisky

External links
 Pernod Ricard official site

Products introduced in 1995
Alcoholic drink brands
Indian whisky
Pernod Ricard brands